"Heartbreaker / Days" is a single by Finnish rock band  The Rasmus which is a composition of the two songs "Heartbreaker" and "Days". It was released on March 11, 2002, by the record label Playground Music.

"Heartbreaker" was originally released on the band's fourth studio album Into on October 29, 2001. "Days" is a b-side track which first was released on this single, and later on "Into (Special Edition)", 2003. The single was the last one from the album, featuring the two remixed tracks of "Heartbreaker": Rock Radio Remix and Pop Radio Remix.

It went to number one on the Finland Singles Chart, although it has not been very popular on other chart lists. No music video has been made for any of these songs.

Track listing

Heartbreaker
11.03.2002, Playground Music Scandinavia
Catalogue Number: PGMCDS 11 Heartbreaker see the booklet and inlay's scans
 "Heartbreaker" (Album Version)- 3:39
 "Days" - 4:12
 "Heartbreaker" (Rock Radio Remix)-
 "Heartbreaker" (Pop Radio Remix)- 3:22

Heartbreaker  German edition
11.03.2002, Playground Music Scandinavia - Edel Records Germany
Catalogue Number: 0136195ERE Heartbreaker see the booklet and inlay's scans

 "Heartbreaker" - 3:39
 "Days" - 4:12
 "Heartbreaker" (Rock Radio Remix)- 3:20
 "Heartbreaker" (Pop Radio Remix)- 3:32
 "Play Dead" (Björk cover) - 3:51

External links
 The Rasmus' official website

The Rasmus songs
2002 singles
Songs written by Lauri Ylönen
2001 songs